The Berlin Society of Friends of Natural Science, (Gesellschaft Naturforschender Freunde zu Berlin, in German) (GNF) is a scientific society founded in 1773. 

Apart from the Danziger Naturforschenden Gesellschaft, it is the oldest private natural society in Germany. At its foundation it had numerous prominent and influential members who were experts in the natural sciences - biologists in particular. The society exists still, and has its seat at the Institute for Zoology of the Free University of Berlin.

Early Members

 Friedrich Heinrich Wilhelm Martini (1729-1778)
 Johann Gottlieb Gleditsch (1714-1786)
 Martin Heinrich Klaproth (1743-1817)
 Dietrich Ludwig Gustav Karsten (1768-1810) 
 Adelbert von Chamisso (1781-1838) 
 Alexander von Humboldt (1769-1859)
 Otto Friedrich Müller (1730-1784)
 Carl Eduard von Martens (1831-1904)
 Hinrich Lichtenstein (1780-1857) 
 Christian Samuel Weiss (1780-1856)
 Hermann Steudner (1832-1863)

External links

 Geschichte der Gesellschaft, Museum für Naturkunde Berlin

Scientific societies based in Germany